Maligiaq Johnsen Padilla (maligiɑq jonˀsn padiɬa) is a Greenlandic kayaker known for his skill with the sea kayak. In 1994, at the age of 12, he won every event in his age group at the National Kayaking Championship.

History
Born in Greenland to an American father and Greenland Inuit mother, Juliane Padilla (née Johnsen), he was raised from age 4 in Sisimiut. Padilla's grandfather, Peter Johnsen, taught him much of what he knows. A skilled kayaker in his own right, Johnsen taught Padilla how to kayak, how to build the boats and how to hunt using a harpoon and rifle. Included in his training were open-ocean skills and traditional kayak building skills. Kayaks built by Padilla are housed at the Greenland  Sisimiut Museum, the Inuit Gallery of Vancouver the Smithsonian Museum in Washington DC and the Kativik Cultural Center in Nome.

In 2010 Padilla moved to Alaska where he is working to revive traditional kayaking culture. He and wife Elizabeth Saagulik Hensley, an Iñupiaq attorney, have two children.

Padilla is the only person in history to win four Greenland National Kayaking Championships, winning his first title at 16.

External links
 SeaKayaker Magazine
 Pictures

References

1982 births
Living people
American people of Greenlandic descent
Greenlandic sportspeople
Danish male canoeists
Greenlandic sportsmen